An electropherogram, or electrophoregram, can also be referred to as an EPG or e-gram. It is a record or chart produced when electrophoresis is used in an analytical technique, primarily in the fields of forensic biology, molecular biology and biochemistry. The method utilizes data points that correspond with a specific time and fluorescence intensity at various wavelengths of light to represent a DNA profile.

In the field of genetics, an electropherogram is a plot of DNA fragment sizes, typically used for genotyping such as DNA sequencing. The data is plotted with time, shown via base pairs (bps), on the x-axis and fluorescence intensity on the y-axis. Such plots are often achieved using an instrument such as an automated DNA sequencer paired with capillary electrophoresis (CE). Such electropherograms may be used to determine DNA sequence genotypes, or genotypes that are based on the length of specific DNA fragments or number of short tandem repeats (STR) at a specific locus by comparing the sample to internal size standards and allelic ladder data using the same size standard. These genotypes can be used for:

genealogical DNA testing
DNA paternity testing
DNA profiling
phylogenetics
population genetics

See also
Gel electrophoresis of nucleic acids

References

External links
PHPH — web-based tool for electropherogram quality analysis
Systematic differences in electropherogram peak heights reported by different versions of the GeneScan Software
DYS464 Electropherogram Interpretation Discrepancy with images

Applied genetics
Biometrics
DNA
Genetic genealogy
Genetics techniques
Laboratory techniques